The Old West End is a historic neighborhood in Toledo, Ohio and is considered to be "the largest neighborhood of late Victorian, Edwardian, and Arts & Crafts homes east of the Mississippi." The south end of the neighborhood is bounded by the Toledo Museum of Art and the eastern edge by churches of many denominations on Collingwood Boulevard.

History
In 1818, the first log home was built in the area now known as the Old West End; then in 1829, the first tavern and store were built.

The Old West End was platted in 1866, and "the wealthiest and most well-to-do of Toledo began moving away from their former downtown homes to live in this new development far from the city". The Old West End "experienced most of its growth between 1875 and 1915."

By the late 1870s, the area became a very popular place to live; "...families began to build 'out in the woods' in the West end.” In the heyday of the neighborhood, “Collingwood Avenue became known as the Avenue and eventually as the Avenue of Churches", because of all of the churches that lined and still line Collingwood Avenue.

The area fell out of vogue in the 1920s and 1930s. In the 1960s, its decline was hastened by the construction of interstate highways. “The construction of the I-75 expressway resulted in the demolition of entire blocks...” 

Like most established U.S. cities, Toledo's historic areas declined, but the residents of the Old West End kept many of the historic landmarks from being demolished.
Their efforts paid off; in 1973, parts of the Old West End were placed on the National Register of Historic Places as a historic district; this district was expanded in 1984.

From the 1970s, the Old West End neighborhood became home to a broadly diverse population of established families, elderly residents, artists and those interested in the arts community, partly because of its proximity to the Toledo Museum of Art. The community also includes singles, minorities, and immigrant residents. Many houses in the neighborhood have been restored.

Festivals and Tours
Old West End Festival: "On the first weekend in June, residents of the Old West End hold their Spring Festival, which features food, entertainment, tours of historic homes, and spontaneous garage sales. Citizen involvement in the Old West End is high, and this is reflected by its many neighborhood organizations."
Old West End Garden Tours: In September, the Old West End Garden Tours festival features a tour of Old West End gardens, concerts, and food. 
 Tours de Noel: In December, Old West End residents open up their homes for tours while decorated for the holidays.

Neighborhood attractions
Countless historic homes and churches.
Mansion View Inn 
Toledo Museum of Art 
Toledo Symphony Orchestra(TMA Peristyle)
Rosary Cathedral
Collingwood Arts Center

External links
Old West End Association 
Old West End Security 
Women of The Old West End 
Old West End Photos

References

Neighborhoods in Toledo, Ohio
Historic sites in Ohio
Geography of Ohio